Joshua Berman is an American writer and producer for television. He was an executive producer on the TV show CSI: Crime Scene Investigation and consulting producer on Bones.

Career
Josh Berman was born in 1972. Berman's writing career began in comedy in 1998 when he won an NBC writing contest. In May 2016, ABC ordered a series drama called Notorious to be written by Berman and blogger Allie Hagan. Inspired by the relationship between famed criminal defense attorney Mark Geragos and long-time Larry King Live executive producer Wendy Walker, Notorious is to be a provocative look at the interplay of criminal law and the media. It follows the professional and personal relationship between a charismatic attorney and a powerhouse television producer, as they attempt to control the media, the justice system, and ultimately – each other. The series stars Perabo as Julia George and Daniel Sunjata as Jake Gregorian. The cast also includes Sepideh Moafi, Kate Jennings Grant, Ryan Guzman, Kevin Zegers, J. August Richards, and Aimee Teegarden. Michael Engler will direct. Berman is one of the series' executive producers.

Berman worked on the series CSI since its first season. He has worked on a number of episodes, including "Crow's Feet", "Mea Culpa", "Unbearable", and "Compulsion". Berman developed the Fox drama series Deviant Behavior, which was later renamed and broadcast under the title Killer Instinct. The show was cancelled after 13 episodes were shot, of which 9 were ultimately broadcast.

On June 4, 2006, Berman negotiated an early release from CSI to focus on the thriller Vanished, the first project to be greenlighted from his four-year pact with 20th Century Fox Television.  The show, which starred Gale Harold and Ming-Na as FBI agents investigating the disappearance of a U.S. senator's wife, premiered August 2006 on the Fox network. The show was canceled.

Berman was a writer and consulting producer on Bones. He wrote a number of episodes, including "Death in the Saddle", "The Wannabe in the Weeds", "The Perfect Pieces in the Purple Pond", and "The Twisted Bones in the Melted Truck".

Drop Dead Diva, created by Berman originally for Fox, premiered on Lifetime on July 12, 2009. Produced by Sony Pictures Television, the series stars stage actress Brooke Elliott as Jane, a brilliant, thoughtful, and overweight attorney whose body is inhabited by the soul of a vapid fashion model, and Margaret Cho as her loyal assistant, Teri. Berman’s grandmother, who he described as having “carried herself as a supermodel,” inspired the character Jane, as Berman sought to bring his grandmother's self-acceptance and life-affirming energy to the screen. Storyline Entertainment's Craig Zadan and Neil Meron serve as executive producers alongside Berman. His Osprey Productions company most recently signed a deal with Sony Pictures Television.

Berman has written and directed Drop Dead Dave, an hour-long series that is still in development as of October 2021. It explores a similar concept to his popular series Drop Dead Diva; the new series follows the character Dave as he finds new perspective when reincarnated as a complicated Gen X lawyer.

Personal life 
Berman is a native of Encino and identifies as gay. His brother, David Berman, is head researcher for CSI, and occasionally plays assistant coroner "Super Dave" Phillips.

References

External links
 

Television producers from California
American television writers
American male television writers
American gay writers
Place of birth missing (living people)
Living people
People from Encino, Los Angeles
Screenwriters from California
LGBT television producers
American LGBT screenwriters
Year of birth missing (living people)